Maltepe University is a private university located in Maltepe district of Istanbul, Turkey. It was established on July 9, 1997 by "Istanbul Marmara Education Foundation" (İMEV).  The institution has a broad scope of education starting from the elementary level to university. The first students graduated in June 2001.

Medium of teaching
Turkish is chosen as the medium of teaching, unlike many other private universities in Turkey, with the belief that an individual can best learn and perform in the mother tongue. However, having the awareness that English is indispensable in the international scientific arena, the university includes an English teaching program. Those students who are not exempt in the proficiency exam of the English language department enroll in the two-semester intensive English preparatory program. All students take compulsory English courses during their undergraduate education.

Academic programs
Undergraduate programs
 Faculty of paedagogy (psychological guidance, English language)
 Faculty of natural sciences and literature (philosophy, mathematics, psychology)
 Faculty of fine arts (acting, film, plastic arts, cartoon making-animation, photography)
 Faculty of law
 Faculty of economics and business administration (economics, business administration, international relations and European Union)
 Faculty of communication sciences (visual communication and design, public relations and publicity, radio-cinema-TV)
 Faculty of architecture (graphic design, interior decoration, architecture)
 Faculty of engineering (computer engineering, electronics, industrial engineering)
 Faculty of medicine (Nursing)

Vocational school
 Radio–TV programming
 Tourism and hotel management
 Computer technology and programming
 Film production techniques

Post-graduate and doctorate programs
 Institute of social sciences (education administration, economics policy, business administration, law, psychology, human sciences, philosophy, radio-cinema-TV)
 Institute of natural sciences (computer science, industrial engineering, mathematics, architecture, civil engineering-earthquake engineering)

General
 Atatürk's reforms and history of the Republic of Turkey
 Foreign languages

Academic staff
As of 2003 academic year, the university holds 300 teaching staff of which 205 are full-time.

Campus
Maltepe University has three campuses. The main campus in Maltepe Eğitim Köyü (Maltepe Education Village), located at Maltepe, Büyükbakkalköy, was opened in September 2003. The President's Office and administrative units are situated on this campus, which extends over an area of 100 hectares comprising faculty buildings, indoor/outdoor sports facilities, an olympic-size swimming pool and student social activities centers.

The university's Dragos campus is located at Dragos, close to the shore on an area of 15,000 m². The Vocational School, The Science Institute, The Social Sciences Institute and The Continuous Education Center are all located on this campus.

The Faculty of medicine and its hospital, which serves its students as an application hospital, are both located in Maltepe, on the campus where the university was first founded.

Affiliations
The university is a member of the Caucasus University Association.

Gallery

See also
 List of universities in Turkey

References

External links
Official website 
Maltepe Sözlük

Maltepe University
Educational institutions established in 1997
Private universities and colleges in Turkey
1997 establishments in Turkey
Maltepe, Istanbul